Agniohammus is a genus of longhorn beetles of the subfamily Lamiinae, containing the following species:

 Agniohammus brunneus (Breuning, 1967)
 Agniohammus olivaceus Breuning, 1936
 Agniohammus philippinensis Breuning, 1938

References

Lamiini